Vijay Mude (born 16 December 1943 in Jalgaon Arvi, Amravati district - 16 August 2020) was a member of the 11th Lok Sabha of India. He represented the Wardha constituency of Maharashtra and is a member of the Bharatiya Janata Party political party.

References

India MPs 1996–1997
1943 births
Living people
Marathi politicians
Bharatiya Janata Party politicians from Maharashtra
Lok Sabha members from Maharashtra
People from Amravati district
People from Wardha